The PLK Best Coach award is an annual award in the Polish PLK that is given to the best coach. A select group of press members can vote for the winner of the award.

Winners

References

External links
Polska Liga Koszykówki - Official Site 
Polish League at Eurobasket.com

Coach